WKJW (1010 AM, "Christian 1010") is a commercial conservative gospel radio station broadcasting at 47,000 watts in Black Mountain, North Carolina, operated by International Baptist Outreach Missions, Inc. of Asheville, North Carolina, Dr J. Wendell Runion, President and General Manager.

The station was founded as WFGW AM in May 1962 by the Billy Graham Evangelistic Association.

A 1970 ad in the Asheville Citizen-Times said WFGW was the only area station playing easy listening music and standards. It was a daytime-only station broadcasting at 50,000 watts.

Prior to 2005, it played mostly Southern gospel music which was moved online. Starting August 1, 2005, as "Faith and Freedom Radio", WFGW was a commercial talk radio station with some Christian talk. WFGW Talk Radio was available on its sister-station's HD signal, 106.9 FM HD3.

WKJW must reduce power to 90 watts at night to protect clear-channel CFRB in Toronto, Ontario, Canada.

International Baptist Outreach Missions, owner of  WKJV of Asheville, N.C., purchased 1010 AM and started broadcasting on July 19, 2013 as WKJW.

FM Translator
An FM translator affords the listener the ability to listen on the FM band with its inherent high fidelity and often stereophonic sound.  In addition, FM stations may broadcast 24 hours per day.

References

External links
FCC History Cards for WKJW

KJW
Talk radio stations in the United States
Radio stations established in 1962
Moody Radio affiliate stations